Martin Ellison is a British economist. He is Professor of economics at the University of Oxford and a Fellow of Nuffield College. He gained his PhD in economics in 2001 from the European University Institute in Florence.

Ellison has worked as a consultant for the Bank of England and as a Professor at the University of Warwick before his current affiliation at the University of Oxford. He is specializing in macroeconomics; his PhD thesis was titled "Money Matters: Four Essays on Monetary Economics". His main research interest is monetary policy and he is editing several journals in the field of economics.

External links
Ellison's webpage at The department of economics, University of Oxford

British economists
Fellows of Nuffield College, Oxford
Living people
Year of birth missing (living people)